The Boy in Blue is a 1986 Canadian drama film directed by Charles Jarrott and starring Nicolas Cage. The film, which was written by Douglas Bowie and co-produced by Steve North, John Kemeny, and Denis Héroux, was distributed by 20th Century Fox. The filming took place in Quebec and Ontario, Canada, which was eventually released for North American theatres on January 17, 1986. The story is based on a true story about the life of Toronto sculler Ned Hanlan.

Plot
This drama follows Ned Hanlan (Nicolas Cage), who is known to be a Canadian competitive rowing champion. Ned Hanlan is adopted by a gambler named Bill, who promotes the boy on the sculling circuit for his own monetary gain. As a young man, Ned is very trouble-prone but does not lack the fierce determination needed in his attempt to become a formidable athlete. In this attempt, a businessman named Knox assumes control of Hanlan's career who backs Ned for his own personal gain and discards him when this gain is no longer in sight. Through Knox, Ned meets and falls for the niece of the businessman, Margaret (Cynthia Dale). Hanlan's professional success is capped by his marriage to Margaret.

Cast

Reception
The film was given a various amount of harsh and negative critical reviews. Based on the critique of 941 IMDb users, the film received a rating of 5.4 out of 10. The review aggregator website Rotten Tomatoes has no score for critics, but a 45% approval rating for audiences based on 712 reviews.

The New York Times believed the film does not go beyond the typical cliche of movies about athletes, believing these types of films follow an obligatory formula. When the formula doesn’t work the film then “looks just plain silly” which The New York Times believed was the case with this film. In the eyes of The New York Times, the film lacked excitement and the performances were no more exciting than the script.

The Montreal Gazettes review of the production was also quite negative. To this critic, the subject of the film is particularly unpromising, believing that most people would not enjoy “the story of a boy who was better than anybody else at pulling two sticks through the water.” The script was also harshly criticized stating that its hard to tell whether some actors are not doing a good job, or if it’s just the script not allowing them to.

The Globe and Mail also give a harsh review, believing that the films major purpose are proving a showcase for an American actor's (Nicolas Cage) chest. The Globe and mail critic had an issue with the casting of Nicolas Cage as he is an American actor who makes no effort to Canadianize himself, as a Canadian legend; the role could have potentially made a Canadian a star. The supporting performances were also seen as terrible, which were blamed on the director Charles Jarrott.

Pierre Mignot's photography was one of the scarce positives to an otherwise negatively reviewed film.

Awards and nominations
The film received three nominations for Genie awards. The Genie Award is given out annually by the Academy of Canadian Cinema and Television to recognize the best of Canadian cinema from 1980-2012.3 Genie award nominations:'

Sean Sullivan - Best performance by an actor in a supporting role.

William Beeton - Best achievement in art direction.

Don White/David Appleby/Dan Latour - Best achievement in sound editing.

References

External links
 
 
 
 

1986 films
1980s biographical drama films
English-language Canadian films
1980s sports drama films
1980s English-language films
Canadian biographical drama films
Rowing films
Sports films based on actual events
Films set in Toronto
20th Century Fox films
Films directed by Charles Jarrott
Canadian sports drama films
1986 drama films
1980s Canadian films